Pennsylvania State Senate District 4  includes parts of Montgomery County and Philadelphia County. It is currently represented by Democrat Arthur L. Haywood III.

District profile
The district includes the following areas:

Montgomery County
 Abington Township
 Cheltenham Township 
 Jenkintown
 Rockledge
 Springfield Township

Philadelphia County
Ward 09
Ward 10
Ward 12 [PART, Divisions 01, 02, 03, 04, 05, 06, 07, 09, 10, 12, 13, 14, 18, 19, 20 and 21]
Ward 17
Ward 22
Ward 50
Ward 59

Senators

References

Pennsylvania Senate districts
Government of Philadelphia
Government of Montgomery County, Pennsylvania